Bleckley County High School is a high school in Cochran, Georgia, United States,  south of Atlanta.  The school reaches students in grades 9-12 from the town of Cochran and the rest of Bleckley County.

Bleckley County built a new high school that opened in the fall of 2005.  In its final year, the previous building was the oldest non-renovated high school in the state of Georgia, and now serves as the county's pre-kindergarten facility. This original building is located on Dykes Street near downtown Cochran. Bleckley County High School is located at 1 Royal Drive just off of the Cochran Bypass and Airport Road.

Bleckley County High attained "Adequate Yearly Progress" for 2009, the only high school in Middle Georgia to do so besides schools in Houston County.

BCHS is a six-time region winner in the one-act play as well as literary competitions.

The football team made it to the elite eight in 2006.  The boys' basketball team did so in 2007, and the baseball team did so in 2009. Girls' cross country has won seven straight region titles; the boys have won four straight. Bleckley girls' track won state in 2007 and finished state runner-up in 2009, boys' track placed best in school history with third in state in 2016. Both the boys' and girls' tennis teams have made multiple runs to the AA final four. BCHS cheerleading has won three state championships. The men's basketball team lost to Greater Atlanta Christian High School in GHSA AA State Basketball Final on March 8, 2013, by a score of 69 - 52.

Bleckley County High School FFA took the title of the 2017 National FFA Forestry CDE Champions in October 2017.

The school's golf team annually awards the Bruce Fleisher Award.
{baseball}
2020 3-AA Region Champs
2020 AA State Champs

References

External links
 

Schools in Bleckley County, Georgia
Public high schools in Georgia (U.S. state)
Georgia Accrediting Commission
Schools accredited by the Southern Association of Colleges and Schools